This is a list of Members of Parliament (MPs) in the Third Protectorate Parliament under the Commonwealth of England which began at Westminster on 27 January 1659, and was held until 22 April 1659.

This Parliament was called by Richard Cromwell  and was dissolved by him after three months,  shortly before he was  turned out of the Protectorship. The parliament was succeeded by a restoration of the last parliament called by Royal Authority, which was originally the Long Parliament called on 3 November 1640, but subsequently reduced to the Rump parliament under Pride's Purge. This summoned a new Convention Parliament to meet on 25 April 1660, which called back the King, and restored the Constitution in Church and State.

This list contains details of the MPs elected in 1659. The preceding First and  Second Protectorate Parliaments had excluded a number of Rotten Boroughs and given representation to several towns including Manchester, Leeds and Halifax and to the county and city of Durham. The Third Protectorate Parliament reverted to the earlier full representation for England but still included representatives from Scotland and Ireland.

List of constituencies and members

See also
List of MPs elected to the English parliament in 1654 (First Protectorate Parliament)
List of MPs elected to the English parliament in 1656 (Second Protectorate Parliament)
List of parliaments of England
Third Protectorate Parliament

Notes

References
 
 

17th-century English parliaments
1659
 
1659 in England
1659 in politics
 List
The Protectorate